Haydée Tamara Bunke Bider (November 19, 1937 – August 31, 1967), better known as Tania or Tania the Guerrillera, was an Argentine-born East German Marxist revolutionary, who played a prominent role in Cuban intelligence operations after the Cuban Revolution and in various Latin American far left revolutionary movements. She fought as a military advisor alongside communist guerrillas led by Che Guevara during the Bolivian insurgency until she was killed in action by CIA-trained and assisted Bolivian Army Rangers.

Early life (1937–52)
Bunke was born in Buenos Aires, Argentina, the daughter of German communist refugees Erich Bunke and Nadia Bider (who was of Polish and Jewish origin). Her father Erich had joined the Communist Party of Germany in 1928 and fled with his wife to Argentina as refugees from Adolf Hitler's National Revolution in 1933. Erich Bunke and Nadia Bider immediately joined the Communist Party of Argentina, ensuring that Tamara and her brother Olaf would both grow up in a Marxist-Leninist political atmosphere. Their family home in Buenos Aires was often used for meetings, helping Communist refugees, hiding publications, and occasionally stashing weapons.

In her youth, Bunke was a keen athlete and an excellent student who developed a particular fondness for the folk music of South America. However, in 1952, the family returned to East Germany and settled in Stalinstadt (renamed Eisenhüttenstadt in 1960). Bunke did not learn the German language until her adolescence.

University years (1953–59)
Bunke thrived in her new environment and began studying political science at Humboldt University in East Berlin. She soon joined the ruling Socialist Unity Party of Germany's youth organization, the Free German Youth (FGY). In addition, she also joined the World Federation of Democratic Youth, allowing her to attend the World Festival of Youth and Students in Vienna, Prague, Moscow and finally Havana, Cuba. Her keen interest in and familiarity with Latin America, along with her linguistic abilities (she spoke fluent Russian, French, English, Spanish, and German), soon saw her translating on behalf of the FGY's International Department. In this capacity she entertained and translated for the growing stream of visitors from Cuba, following the victory of the 1959 Cuban Revolution.

Cuba and Che Guevara (1960–64)

In 1960, at the age of 23, Bunke met the Marxist revolutionary Che Guevara. Guevara was visiting the East German city of Leipzig with a Cuban trade delegation and Bunke, who considered him a hero of hers, was assigned to him as an interpreter. Inspired by the Cuban Revolution, of which Guevara had become an international icon, Bunke came to live in Cuba in 1961. She first sought out voluntary work, teaching and building homes and schools in the countryside. Her Cuban hosts soon began to notice the efficiency, discipline and good-natured sense of service that she possessed. As a result, she participated in work brigades, the militia, and the Cuban Literacy Campaign. She also worked in the Ministry of Education, the Cuban Institute of Friendship with the Peoples, and the Federation of Cuban Women.

Eventually she was selected for training to take part in Che's ill-fated guerrilla expedition to Bolivia entitled "Operation Fantasma". Guevara's goal was to spark a continent-wide revolutionary uprising into neighbouring Argentina, Paraguay, Brazil, Peru, and Chile; by creating "two, three, many Vietnams" in order to challenge American imperialism. In preparation, Guevara assigned Bunke to be trained by Dariel Alarcón Ramírez (known by his nom de guerre Benigno) in Pinar del Río in western Cuba. Guevara wanted her taught self-defence, such as how to use a knife, submachine gun, and pistol; and how to send and receive telegraph transmissions and coded messages by radio. It was during this period that she took the name "Tania" as her nom de guerre. During her training in Cuba and later by the StB at a small farm on the outskirts of Prague, Bunke impressed the Cubans with her intelligence, stamina, and skill for espionage. Benigno for instance has described her as "gracious, beautiful and kind, but also very tough". She further endeared herself to the Cubans by entertaining them in the training camp by playing Argentine folk songs on accordion or guitar. Moreover, as a very sociable person who could strike up friendships easily, the Cuban government realized that she possessed beneficial traits for her future work in Bolivia.

Bolivian insurgency (1964–67)

In October 1964, Bunke traveled to Bolivia under the name Laura Gutiérrez Bauer, as a secret agent for Guevara's last campaign. Her first mission was to gather intelligence on Bolivia's political elite and the strength of its armed forces. Posing as a right-wing folklore expert of Argentine background, she quickly found herself infiltrating high society and rubbing shoulders with the glitterati of Bolivia's academic and official circles. Showing how high she was able to rise in La Paz society, she won the adoration of Bolivian President René Barrientos, and even went on holiday with him to Peru. In order to maintain her cover, she also busied herself part-time with her explorations of folk music (producing one of the most valuable collections of Bolivian music in the process) and entered into a marriage of convenience with a young Bolivian to gain citizenship.

Tactically, she was initially invaluable to Guevara's guerrillas because she used radio equipment hidden in a compartment behind the wall in her apartment to not only send coded messages to Fidel Castro in Havana; but to Guevara's guerrillas in the field by posing as a radiohost giving encoded relationship advice to fictitious lovelorn couples. This radio program was called "Advice to Women".

In late 1966 however, the unreliability of many of her comrades in the urban network set up to support Che's guerrillas forced Bunke to travel to their rural camp at Ñancahuazú on a number of occasions. On one of these trips, a captured Bolivian communist gave away a safe house where Tania's jeep was parked in which she had left her address book. As a result, her cover was blown, and she now had no other choice than to join Guevara's armed guerrilla campaign. In this capacity, she was in charge of rationing food and monitoring radio broadcasts. There continues to also be the allegation from fellow surviving guerrilla Benigno, that Bunke and Guevara had at some point become lovers in Bolivia; with Benigno remarking decades later in 2008 that "You could tell by the way they spoke so quietly and looked at each other when they were together near the end".

Without Bunke as the guerrilla's contact to the outside world, the guerrillas then found themselves isolated. Bunke also soon found herself battling a high fever, a leg injury, and the painful effects of the Chigoe flea parasite. Consequently, Guevara decided to try to send a group of 16 other ailing combatants, including Bunke, out of the mountains.

Death

At 5:20 pm on August 31, 1967, the lead guerrilla column was ambushed while crossing the Río Grande at Vado del Yeso. Tania was waist-deep in the water, with her rifle held above her head, when she was shot through the arm and the lung and killed along with eight of her fellow insurgents in quick succession. Her body was then carried downstream and only recovered by the Bolivian Army several days later on September 6. When her corpse was presented to Barrientos, it was decided that it would be buried in an unmarked grave with the rest of the guerrillas. However, the local campesino women demanded that, as a woman, she be given a proper Christian burial.

When her death was announced over the radio, Guevara, still struggling through the jungles close by, refused to believe the news; suspecting it was army propaganda to demoralize him. Later, when Fidel Castro learned of her demise, he declared "Tania the guerrilla" a hero of the Cuban Revolution.

Remains
After the research of biographer Jon Lee Anderson led to the 1997 discovery of Che Guevara's remains, Bunke's remains were also tracked down to an unmarked grave in a small pit on the periphery of the Vallegrande army base on October 13, 1998. They were transferred to Cuba and were interred in the Che Guevara Mausoleum in the city of Santa Clara, alongside those of Guevara himself and several other guerrillas killed during the Bolivian insurgency.

KGB, Stasi, and affair claims
Since the time of her death there have been various conflicting rumors or allegations that she worked for the Soviet KGB and/or the East German Stasi; along with the claim that she and Che Guevara were lovers while in Bolivia, and that she may have even been carrying his child when she was killed; this was finally refuted in 2017 by Dr. Abraham Baptista, who was in charge of the autopsy of both Ché and Tamara Bunke.

In 1997, in response to decades of unproven rumors and claims that Tamara Bunke worked for the KGB or the East German Stasi, her 85-year-old mother, Nadia Bunke, travelled to Moscow to obtain a written statement from the successors to the KGB denying that Bunke ever worked for them. For their part, the Stasi Records Agency of the German Federal Republic has also confirmed that they have no records about her.

Before Nadia Bunke died in 2003, she also managed to have the book Tania, the Woman Che Guevara Loved by Uruguayan author José A Friedl, removed from sale in Germany. German courts ruled that the book contained defamatory allegations against Tamara Bunke; namely Friedl repeated Stasi defector Günter Männel's rumor from the 1970s that Bunke and Guevara started an extramarital affair in 1965 while training together in the Czechoslovak Socialist Republic's capital of Prague. However, although they both did receive instruction by the StB in Prague, they were never in the city at the same time.

Popular culture
During her involvement with the Symbionese Liberation Army in 1974, Patty Hearst took on the alias "Tania".
Minor planet 2283 Bunke, discovered in 1974 by Soviet astronomer Lyudmila Zhuravlyova, is named after her.
 Venezuelan folk singer songwriter Ali Primera wrote a song titled "Tania," commemorating Bunke and her dedication to revolution.
Tania Bunke also appears intermittently in the first part of Luigi Nono's 1972 music/theatre work Al gran sole carico d'amore.
Heidi Specogna filmed a documentary about her in 1991.
Before unification, Bunke was a folk legend in East Germany. At one time, there were 200 youth clubs named after her.
She is portrayed by Franka Potente in Steven Soderbergh's 2008 biopic of Che Guevara, entitled Che.

In fiction
A 2007 novel by Chilean economist Sebastián Edwards entitled El misterio de las Tanias is inspired by Bunke's story.
A character known as Tania Vunke appears in Chuck Pfarrers novel Killing Che. In the story Tania is an East German KGB spy who falls in love with Guevara when she is supposed to be helping to kill him. Eventually she betrays the KGB to fight for Che and dies in battle.
A fictionalized version of Bunke appears in the shared world anthology Heroes in Hell, created by Janet Morris. Written in the 1980s, this version of Bunke incorporates what was then commonly believed about her work for the KGB and betraying Che to his death. In this series, Bunke is working for one of Satan's various intelligence agencies and is sent to find and (temporarily) assassinate Che, who is now running Hell's Dissidents

Further reading
Tania, the Woman Che Guevara Loved, by José Antonio Friedl Zapata, Planeta, 1997, 
Tania: Undercover With Che Guevara in Bolivia, by Ulises Estrada, Ocean Press (AU), 2005,

References

External links

Images of Tania
Members of Che Guevara's Guerrilla Movement in Bolivia – by the Latin American Studies Organization

1937 births
1967 deaths
People from Buenos Aires
Anti-revisionists
Argentine communists
Argentine Jews
Argentine revolutionaries
Cuban spies
East German spies
Socialist Unity Party of Germany politicians
Women in war in South America
Argentine people of German-Jewish descent
Argentine people of Polish-Jewish descent
Che Guevara
Guerrillas killed in action
Deaths by firearm in Bolivia
Women in warfare post-1945
Argentine emigrants to East Germany
University of Havana alumni
East German women
People from Bezirk Frankfurt